Ermerveen is a hamlet in the Netherlands and it is part of the Emmen municipality in Drenthe.

Ermerveen is a statistical entity, however the postal authorities have placed it under Veenoord. It was first mentioned in the 1850s as Het ErmerVeen, and means "the bog near Erm. It is located outside the build-up area.

References 

Populated places in Drenthe
Emmen, Netherlands